Taniela Tupou (born 10 May 1996) is an Australian professional rugby union player. He plays as a tight head prop for the Queensland Reds in Super Rugby and has represented  in international rugby. Born in Tonga he qualifies for Australia by residency.

Early life and career
Tupou became known as a schoolboy rugby player. While playing for Auckland’s Sacred Heart College First XV  in 2014, he became an internet sensation for his three tries against Kelston Boys High School, earning him the nickname "Tongan Thor".

On 22 June 2014, he was named in the Pacific Barbarians squad, captained by All Black legend Justin Marshall, to play Tonga during the 2014 mid-year rugby union internationals. Tonga won the match 36–14 at Mount Smart Stadium in Auckland.

The following month Tupou was given a deadline to sign a loyalty agreement to be eligible for the New Zealand Schoolboys team. However, he declined the offer. Despite interest from rugby clubs in France and England as well as New Zealand Super Rugby franchises Chiefs and Blues, Tupou's desire to play for the Wallabies lured him to Australia where his brother, Criff Tupou, resided.

Michael Cheika, head coach of the New South Wales Waratahs commented that he had an eye on Tupou well before he emerged on television with his three-try effort, but on 12 September 2014 Tupou was officially named in the Queensland Reds squad for the 2015 season.

Rugby career
Tupou played his first game for the Brothers Old Boys club in 2015, in a trial match alongside his 25-year-old brother Criff Tupou. After completing the full 2015 season in Queensland Premier Rugby with Brothers, he joined Queensland Country to play in the National Rugby Championship.

After playing for Queensland Under-20 in 2016, he made his debut for the Reds in 2016. Tupou toured as a development player in the Australian national squad for the 2016 Wallabies tour. His strong NRC form for Queensland Country the following year led to his international debut for the Wallabies against  at Murrayfield on 24 November 2017.

Super Rugby statistics

References

1996 births
Australia international rugby union players
Tongan rugby union players
Queensland Reds players
Rugby union props
Living people
People educated at Sacred Heart College, Auckland
Queensland Country (NRC team) players